Crozet is a commune in the Ain department in eastern France.

Its chief attraction is a cable car which carries hikers to the top of the Jura during the summer and serves a small ski resort during the winter.  It has several sporting clubs: the St-Genis-Ferney-Crozet sporting association (soccer), a tennis club, and a ski club.  Other places of interest include the remains of the château de Rossillon, a church (reconstructed around 1830), the Crozet forest, and the Monts-Jura ski area, which runs between Crozet and the town of Lélex in the adjacent valley.

Religious history
Saint Peter Chanel, later to die as a missionary in the Pacific and be declared a martyr and eventually canonised, was parish priest of Crozet between 1827 and 1830, and Church histories credit him with having at a short time revitalized this then run down parish.

Population

See also
Communes of the Ain department

References

External links

 Lelex-Crozet
 Monts Jura resort
 Crozet's webpage 
 Crozet's ski club 

Communes of Ain
Ain communes articles needing translation from French Wikipedia